Miletićevo is a village located in the Plandište municipality, in the South Banat District, Vojvodina, Serbia. As of 2011, the village has a population of 497 inhabitants.

Name
In Serbian, the village is known as Miletićevo (Милетићево), in Hungarian as Ráróspuszta, and in Croatian as Miletićevo.

Demographics

According to the last official census done in 2011, the village of Miletićevo has 497 inhabitants.

See also
List of places in Serbia
List of cities, towns and villages in Vojvodina

References

Slobodan Ćurčić, Broj stanovnika Vojvodine, Novi Sad, 1996.

Populated places in Serbian Banat
Populated places in South Banat District
Plandište